"Can You Hear Me?" is a ballad by English musician David Bowie from his 1975 album Young Americans. Bowie called it a "real love song", written with someone in mind, but he did not identify them. The song was released as a single in November 1975 on the B side of "Golden Years".

Chris O'Leary writes that "Can You Hear Me?", with its guilt and "studied unease", is "sumptuous, its intro alone masterful": "Once we were lovers / Can they understand? / Closer than others, I was your / I was your man." The alto sax, played by David Sanborn and introduced in the third verse, "becomes a competing vocal line". The arrangement and "small cathedral of voices" obscure the "pathetic man at the heart of the song".

The song was written by Bowie, produced by Bowie, Tony Visconti, and Harry Maslin, and engineered by Carl Paruolo. The backing vocalists included the 24-year-old Luther Vandross at the very beginning of his career.

Recordings
Then known as "Take It In Right", the song was first recorded on 1 January 1974 at Olympic Studios in Barnes, London. As "Can You Hear Me?", it was included in Bowie's soul album The Gouster, recorded in 1974 but released posthumously on the box set Who Can I Be Now? (1974–1976) (2016).

Bowie decided in 1974 to have the Scottish singer Lulu record the song, which they did on 25 March, again at Olympic, and on 17 April at RCA's studio in New York. It was at the New York session that Bowie first met the guitarist Carlos Alomar, who became a major collaborator. Bowie believed that Lulu had the potential to be a great soul singer. "Lulu's got this terrific voice, and it's been misdirected all this time, all these years," he told an interviewer in 1974. "People laugh now, but they won't in two years time, you see! I produced a single with her – 'Can You Hear Me' – and that's more the way she's going. She's got a real soul voice, she can get the feel of Aretha, but it's been so misdirected." He said he wanted take her to Memphis and record an album with her and a band such as Willie Mitchell's. According to Nicholas Pegg, the recording of Lulu singing "Can You Hear Me?" is "one of the lost grails of Bowie fans".

On 13–18 August 1974, Bowie recorded "Can You Hear Me?" at Sigma Sound in Philadelphia for Young Americans. In August 1975, he told Anthony O'Grady, in an interview for New Musical Express: "'Can You Hear Me' was written for somebody but I'm not telling you who it is. That is a real love song. I kid you not."

A live performance recorded on 20 October 1974, during the third leg of Bowie's Diamond Dogs Tour, was released in 2020 on I'm Only Dancing (The Soul Tour 74).  Bowie also sang the song live on 23 November 1975 with Cher, on The Cher Show on CBS.

Personnel

 Producers:
 David Bowie
 Tony Visconti
 Harry Maslin
 Strings arrangement:
Tony Visconti
 Engineering
Carl Paruolo
 Musicians:
David Bowie: lead vocal
Carlos Alomar: rhythm guitar
Mike Garson: piano
David Sanborn: alto saxophone
Willie Weeks: bass guitar
Andy Newmark: drums
Larry Washington and possibly Pablo Rosario: conga
Luther Vandross, Ava Cherry, Robin Clark, possibly Diane Sumler and Anthony Hinton: backing vocals
Unknown: strings

References

Sources

1970s ballads
1974 songs
1975 singles
1975 songs
Blue-eyed soul songs
British soul songs
David Bowie songs
RCA Records singles
Wikipedia requested audio of songs
Song recordings produced by Tony Visconti
Songs written by David Bowie
Soul ballads